Campobasso is a city and comune in southern Italy, the capital of the region of Molise and of the province of Campobasso. It is located in the high basin of the Biferno river, surrounded by Sannio and Matese mountains.

Campobasso is renowned for the craftsmanship of blades (including scissors and knives), a fact well documented since the 14th century. It is also famous for the production of pears and scamorza (cheese). The city is the home of the University of Molise and of the Archdiocese of Campobasso-Boiano.

History

The origins of Campobasso are disputed. According to the most widely held theory, the city was founded by the Lombards before the 8th century as a fortified camp on the slope of the hill where the castle stands.  The original name was Campus vassorum, suggesting that the city was the seat of the vassals of the duke of Spoleto.

After the Norman conquest of Southern Italy, Campobasso lost its importance as a defensive stronghold, but became a significant trading and administration centre.

From 1330 to 1745 the city was ruled by the Monforte-Gambatesa family, who built the castle and established a mint. Later it came under the control of the Di Capua, Gonzaga, Vitagliano, Carafa and Romano families.

The original old town of Campobasso contains the Castello Monforte, although in 1732 the inhabitants built a new town on a lower-level plain.
In 1763 the citizens abandoned the old city and settled in the lower valley. The current city was expanded in 1814 by the king of Naples Joachim Murat, and lies on the Campo Basso ("Low field").

Campobasso was the scene of heavy fighting during the Second World War. In the months of October and November 1943 a battle between the German and the Canadian troops for possession of the city caused the destruction of many public buildings, including the City Hall and the archives held there.  Thirty eight civilians were killed in the action, including the bishop of the diocese, Bishop Secondo Bologna, and an unknown number of people were injured in the intensive bombardment.  The occupation by the Canadian troops, and the administrative and political control resulting, had such an impact on the town that it became known as "Canada Town" or "Maple Leaf City".

In 1995 the city was awarded the Bronze Medal for Civil Valour in recognition of the hard work done in clearing the region of dangerous unexploded warheads, a task that lasted well into 1948.

Main sights
One of the mains attractions of Campobasso is the Castello Monforte, built in 1450 by the local ruler Nicola II Monforte, over Lombard or Norman ruins.  The castle has Guelph merlons and stands on a commanding point, where traces of ancient settlements (including Samnite walls) have been found. The current construction is the result of later rebuilding after the earthquakes of 1456 and 1805.

Next to the castle is the Chiesa della Madonna del Monte (Santa Maria Maggiore), erected in the 11th century and rebuilt in 1525. It houses a precious wooden statue of the Incoronata from 1334. Below the castle, the church of St. George is probably the oldest in Campobasso, built around the year 1000 AD over the ruins of a Pagan temple.

The Cathedral, or Chiesa della Santissima Trinità (Church of the Holy Trinity), was built in 1504 outside the city walls. It was destroyed by an earthquake in 1805 and a new Neoclassical edifice was built in 1829.

The church of San Bartolomeo is a Romanesque building from the 11th century, in limestone. The interior has a nave and two aisles.

San Leonardo (14th century) has a façade mixing Gothic and Romanesque elements, and a side mullioned window with vegetable decorations influenced by the Apulian architecture of the period.

Villa de Capoa, recently restored, is a noteworthy garden with statues and a wide variety of plant species, including sequoias, Norway Spruces, cypresses and Lebanon Cedars.

Government

International relations

Twin towns – sister cities
Campobasso is twinned with:
 Ottawa, Canada
 Lezhë, Albania
 Frontera Hidalgo, Mexico
 Mahopac, United States
 Vladimir, Russia
 Banja Luka, Bosnia and Herzegovina
  Sassari, Italy

Transportation

Railways

Campobasso railway station, which is managed by Centostazioni, is located in the centre of the city at the junction of two lines: that from Termoli to Vairano and the branch from Benevento.

Roads and highways
Road traffic is regulated by the State Road Sannitica, by the State Road SS645 Del Tappino and by the State Road 647 Fondo Valle del Biferno.

Public transport
The urban public transport consists of 23 lines of autobus managed by the SEAC company.

Geography

Climate
During the winter, snowfalls are frequent.

Notable people
Fred Bongusto, singer
Alberto Bonucci, actor
Dino Bravo, professional wrestler
Tony Dallara, singer
Pasquale Gravina, volleyball player
Tito Mattei, classical music composer
Fabrizio Brienza, model and actor

See also
University of Molise
Campobasso Calcio
Campobasso railway station

References

External links

 

 
Cities and towns in Molise